Derryberry is a surname. Notable people with the surname include: 

Debi Derryberry, American voice actress
Elizabeth Derryberry, American academic
Larry Derryberry (1939–2016), American politician
William Everett Derryberry (1906–1991) was an American football player and coach, and university president

Other
Derryberry House, also known as Pineview, a mansion in Spring Hill, Tennessee, US